Christopher Richard Granville Kippax (born 3 May 1969) is a former English cricketer. Kippax was a right-handed batsman. He was born in Leeds, Yorkshire.

Kippax played a single List A match for Cumberland in the Cheltenham & Gloucester Trophy against Devon in September 2002. Kippax scored five runs and bowled five wicket-less overs.

Between 1999 and 2001, Kippax played for Radcliffe-on-Trent in the Nottinghamshire Cricket Board Premier League and for Harrogate in the Yorkshire Premier League from 2003 to 2004.

His father, Peter, played first-class cricket for Yorkshire, while his brother, Simon, played List A cricket for Cumberland.

References

1969 births
Cricketers from Leeds
Cumberland cricketers
English cricketers
Living people